Skuta Alfred Mtsi ( 1950–1951  12 July 2020) was a South African politician who served as the Mayor of Buffalo City, South Africa. Prior to his mayoral tenure he served as a member of the Eastern Cape Provincial Legislature and later served as the Speaker of the Buffalo City council before his death.

Early life
Skuta Alfred Mtsi was born in  1950–1951 and grew up in Ncerha Village, outside of East London. He attended Hebron Primary School, Mzimkhulu Higher Primary and Gcisa Commercial High School. He was expelled from school in 11th grade for attending an "illegal gathering" with 19 other students.

He graduated with a Master's degree in public administration and an advanced certificate in public administration and management from the University of Fort Hare, a certificate in governance and leadership from the University of South Africa, and a certificate in advanced governance and public leadership from the University of the Witwatersrand.

Career
Mtsi became involved in politics during the Soweto uprising in 1976. In 1983, he started working for Mercedes-Benz. In 1989, he served as a shop steward of NUMSA. In 1991, he served as chairman of COSATU and served as chairman of COSATU in the Border Region from 1992 to 1993.

Politics
In 1990, Mtsi became a member of the African National Congress and the South African Communist Party. He served as a member of the Eastern Cape Provincial Legislature from 1999 to 2014.

In June 2015, Mtsi was inaugurated as Mayor of Buffalo City, South Africa to fill the vacancy created by Zukiswa Ncitha's resignation. He served until August 2016. In 2016, Mtsi was elected to serve as Speaker of the Buffalo City council.

Death
On 7 July 2020, Mtsi was hospitalized at the Life Beacon Bay Hospital in East London after contracting COVID-19 during the COVID-19 pandemic in South Africa. He died on 12 July. Mtsi was the third member of the Buffalo City council to die from the disease after Zukiswa Mankayi and Gideon Norexe.

Electoral history

References

1950s births
2020 deaths
Members of the Eastern Cape Provincial Legislature
Mayors of places in South Africa
21st-century South African politicians
Place of birth missing
University of Fort Hare alumni
University of South Africa alumni
University of the Witwatersrand alumni
African National Congress politicians
Deaths from the COVID-19 pandemic in South Africa